Acheke (Ebrié:), also spelled attiéké (Ivory Coast), "attcheke" or akyeke (Ghana), is a side dish made from cassava that is popular and traditional in West Africa. The dish is prepared from fermented cassava pulp that has been grated or granulated. Dried attiéké is also prepared, which is similar in texture to couscous.

Attcheke is an Ivorian specialty which is prepared by the Ivorian people and more particularly the people from the southeast part of the country. It is made from grated cassava that is fermented, and is flavorful when eaten with fried fish with ground pepper garnished with chopped pepper and onion with a little seasoning for taste added with palm oil to give it a yellowish look and different taste. One can also eat akyeke with smoked fish and stew. It can be served with soup as well.

Preparation method
The cassava is peeled, grated and mixed with a small amount of cassava that was previously fermented which is the starter. (The starter has different names depending on the ethnic group that produces it: mangnan Ebrié lidjrou in Adjoukrou and bêdêfon in Allandjan.) The paste is left to ferment for one or two days. Once the fermentation time is over and the hydrocyanic acid that exists in a large proportion in natural cassava has been removed, the pulp is dewatered, screened, and dried, and then the final cooking is done by steaming the pulp. After a few minutes of cooking, the attiéké is ready for consumption. It is best served with grilled fish and pepper or tomato.

Attiéké sold at markets is usually precooked.

See also

 Fufu
 Ghanaian cuisine
 List of African dishes

References

Further reading

External links
 Attiéké images on Flickr

Ghanaian cuisine
Ivorian cuisine
West African cuisine